Amata ragazzii is a species of moth of the family Erebidae first described by Emilio Turati in 1917. It is found in Italy.

Adults have been recorded on wing in June and July.

The larvae feed on various low-growing plants, including Plantago, Rumex, Galium and Taraxacum species.

Subspecies
Amata ragazzii ragazzii
Amata ragazzii asperomontana (Stauder, 1917)
Amata ragazzii silaensis Obraztsov, 1966

References 

ragazzii
Endemic fauna of Italy
Moths of Europe
Moths described in 1917